Lemponye Tshireletso (born 26 August 1987) is a Botswana footballer who currently plays for Township Rollers FC and Botswana national football team as a centre forward.

International career

International goals
Scores and results list Botswana's goal tally first.

Honours

Club
 Mochudi Centre Chiefs
Botswana Premier League:1
2014-15

 Township Rollers
Botswana Premier League:3
2016-17, 2017-18, 2018-19
Mascom Top 8 Cup:1
2017-18

Individual
Botswana Premier League Golden Boot: 2015

References

External links
 
 African Cup of Nations - Selolwane to skipper Botswana

1984 births
Living people
Botswana footballers
Botswana international footballers
2012 Africa Cup of Nations players
Gilport Lions F.C. players
Association football midfielders